Maxime Tissot (born October 2, 1985 in Sallanches) is an alpine skier and soldier from France.  He competed for France at the 2010 Winter Olympics where he finished 16th.

References

External links
 
 

1985 births
Living people
French male alpine skiers
Olympic alpine skiers of France
Alpine skiers at the 2010 Winter Olympics
Sportspeople from Haute-Savoie